Esperança is the seventh Portuguese-language album in the live praise and worship series of contemporary worship music by Diante do Trono.

About the project 

In the pre-recording of the Esperança, the mining group released the Quero Me Apaixonar album, recorded at the Campo de Marte Airport, in São Paulo.

The group once again reaffirmed its intention to hold large gatherings of worshipers in their recordings when this brought, according to the Civil Police, an audience of about 1,200,000 people. The album sold over 650,000 copies, charting successes in churches throughout Brazil as "Eis-me Aqui" and "Esperança" (theme song).

By Talent Trophy 2005, the Esperança album won the awards for Best CD and Best Praise and Worship CD of the Year, the ministry Diante do Trono was awarded as Group of the Year.

Track listings

CD

DVD

References

2004 live albums
2004 video albums
Live video albums
Diante do Trono video albums
Diante do Trono live albums
Portuguese-language live albums